Copelatus gestroi is a species of diving beetle. It is part of the genus Copelatus in the subfamily Copelatinae of the family Dytiscidae. It was described by Régimbart in 1892.

References

gestroi
Beetles described in 1892